The Wieluń denar was 14th century silver coin minted in Wieluń. It served as a currency of the Duchy of Wieluń, that existed between 1370 and 1391.

Description 
The coin was made out of silver and weighed around 0.25 g (0.009 oz). Its diameter was between 12 to 14 mm.

On the obverse, the coin had an image of the battlemented tower with a pointy roof and the ball at the top, which was located between two crosses. The side had an inscription that read: "MONETA VELUNES", which meant literally minted in Wieluń. On the reverse it had the moon and an eagle without a crown, faced to the right. The inscription of that said read: "DUCI[S] [LADIS]LAI" indicating that it was minted from the orders of the duke Vladislaus II of Opole.

See also 

 Denarius
 Dinar

Explanatory notes

References 

Coins of Poland
Currencies of Poland
Medieval currencies
Silver coins
Duchy of Wieluń